
The Ferrari 553 was a racing car produced by Ferrari which raced in  (when the World Championship was run to F2 regulations) as a Formula Two car and in  as a Formula One car.

553 F1
The 1953 553 F2 car was raced in the 1953 World Drivers' Championship by Umberto Maglioli and Piero Carini. It was first raced at Monza in the 1953 Italian Grand Prix on September 13, 1953. In 1954 the Ferrari 553 F1 car replaced it when the World Championship returned to F1 specifications.

The car competed in six World Championship Grands Prix over the two seasons, making ten individual entries. Its only points finishing position was a win for Mike Hawthorn at the 1954 Spanish Grand Prix.

The engine was a Lampredi inline-four, producing  at 7200 rpm, from 2497.56 cc of total capacity. Because of the distinctive rounded bodywork and air-intake it was nicknamed Squalo, meaning Shark in Italian.

555 F1
In 1955, Ferrari updated their existing 553 F1 car. New helical springs were used for the front suspension, instead of the transverse leaf-springs. The rear saw the replacement of a lower leaf-spring to an upper one. It also received a five-speed gearbox instead of a four-speed. It used the same capacity as before and the power output also remained the same.

Because of the extended, rounded bodywork it was further nicknamed as a Supersqualo (Super shark). The car was first used at the Bordeaux GP on 24 April 1955. In 1956, Peter Collins was still using the 555 F1, whilst the rest of the Scuderia drove the Lancia-Ferrari D50.

Formula One World Championship results

(key)

References

External links 
 Ferrari 553 F2: Ferrari History
 Ferrari 553 F1: Ferrari History
 Ferrari 555 F1: Ferrari History

553
Formula Two cars